The North American Aviation T-28 Trojan is a radial-engine military trainer aircraft manufactured by North American Aviation and used by the United States Air Force and United States Navy beginning in the 1950s. Besides its use as a trainer, the T-28 was successfully employed as a counter-insurgency aircraft, primarily during the Vietnam War. It has continued in civilian use as an aerobatics and warbird performer.

Design and development
On September 24, 1949, the XT-28 (company designation NA-159) was flown for the first time, designed to replace the T-6 Texan. The T-28A arrived at the Air Proving Ground, Eglin Air Force Base, Florida, in mid-June 1950, for suitability tests as an advanced trainer by the 3200th Fighter Test Squadron, with consideration given to its transition, instrument, and gunnery capabilities. Found satisfactory, a contract was issued and between 1950 and 1957, a total of 1,948 were built.

Following the T-28's withdrawal from U.S. military service, a number were remanufactured by Hamilton Aircraft into two versions called the Nomair. The first refurbished machines, designated T-28R-1 were similar to the standard T-28s they were adapted from, and were supplied to the Brazilian Navy. Later, a more ambitious conversion was undertaken as the T-28R-2, which transformed the two-seat tandem aircraft into a five-seat cabin monoplane for general aviation use. Other civil conversions of ex-military T-28As were undertaken by PacAero as the Nomad Mark I and Nomad Mark II

Operational history

After becoming adopted as a primary trainer by the USAF, the United States Navy and Marine Corps adopted it as well. Although the Air Force phased out the aircraft from primary pilot training by the early 1960s, continuing use only for limited training of special operations aircrews and for primary training of select foreign military personnel, the aircraft continued to be used as a primary trainer by the Navy (and by default, the Marine Corps and Coast Guard) well into the early 1980s.

The largest single concentration of this aircraft was employed by the U.S. Navy at Naval Air Station Whiting Field in Milton, Florida, in the training of student naval aviators. The T-28's service career in the U.S. military ended with the completion of the phase-in of the T-34C turboprop trainer. The last U.S. Navy training squadron to fly the T-28 was VT-27 "Boomers", based at Naval Air Station Corpus Christi, Texas, flying the last T-28 training flight in early 1984. The last T-28 in the Training Command, BuNo 137796, departed for Naval District Washington on 14 March 1984 to be displayed permanently at Naval Support Facility Anacostia, D.C.

Vietnam War combat

In 1963, a Royal Lao Air Force T-28 piloted by Lieutenant Chert Saibory, a Thai national, defected to North Vietnam.  Saibory was immediately imprisoned and his aircraft was impounded.  Within six months the T-28 was refurbished and commissioned into the North Vietnamese Air Force as its first fighter aircraft.

T-28s were supplied to the Republic of Vietnam Air Force (RVNAF) in support of ARVN ground operations, seeing extensive service during the Vietnam War in RVNAF hands, as well as the Secret War in Laos. A T-28 Trojan was the first US fixed wing attack aircraft (non-transport type) lost in South Vietnam, during the Vietnam War. Capt. Robert L. Simpson, USAF, Detachment 2A, 1st Air Commando Group, and Lt. Hoa, RVNAF, were shot down by ground fire on August 28, 1962 while flying close air support. Neither crewman survived. The USAF lost 23 T-28s to all causes during the war, with the last two losses occurring in 1968.

Other combat uses
T-28s were used by the CIA in the former Belgian Congo during the 1960s.

The T-28B and D were the primary ground attack aircraft of Khmer Air Force in Cambodia during the war there, largely provided from the U.S. Military Equipment Delivery Team and maintained by Air America. On the night of 21 January 1971, PAVN sappers managed to get close enough to destroy the majority at Pochentong airbase. Replacements were quickly shipped in.  On 17 March 1973 a pilot of a T-28, said to be Capt. So Petra, a common-law husband of one of the daughters of the overthrown Prince Norodom Sihanouk, machine gunned and bombed the palace of Lon Nol in an attempt to assassinate him, killing at least 20 and wounding 35, before defecting to Khmer Rouge held lands.

France's Armée de l'Air used locally re-manufactured Trojans, T-28S Fennec, for close support missions in Algeria.

Nicaragua replaced its fleet of 30+ ex-Swedish P-51s with T-28s in the early 1960s, with more aircraft acquired in the 1970s and 1980s.

The Philippines utilized T-28s (colloquially known as "Tora-toras") during the 1989 Philippine coup attempt. The aircraft were often deployed as dive bombers by rebel forces.

Civilian use
AeroVironment modified and armored a T-28A to fly weather research for South Dakota School of Mines & Technology, funded by the National Science Foundation, and operated in this capacity from 1969 to 2005. SDSM&T was planning to replace it with another modified, but more modern, former military aircraft, specifically a Fairchild Republic A-10 Thunderbolt II. This plan was found to carry too many risks associated with the costly modifications required and the program was cancelled in 2018.

Aerobatics and warbird display
Many retired T-28s were subsequently sold to private civil operators, and due to their reasonable operating costs are often found flying or displayed as warbirds today.

Variants

XT-28
Prototype; two built.

T-28A
U.S. Air Force version with an  Wright R-1300-1 radial engine driving a two-bladed propeller; 1,194 built.

T-28B
U.S. Navy land-based trainer version with  Wright R-1820-86 radial engine driving a three-bladed propeller and fitted with a belly-mounted speed brake; 489 built from new and 17 converted from T-28.

T-28C
U.S. Navy version, a T-28B with shortened propeller blades and tailhook for carrier-landing training; 299 built.

T-28D Nomad
T-28Bs converted for the USAF in 1962 for the counter-insurgency, reconnaissance, search and rescue, and forward air controller roles in Vietnam. Fitted with two underwing hardpoints. The later T-28D-5 had ammo pans inside the wings that could be hooked up to hardpoint-mounted gun pods for a better center of gravity and aerodynamics; 321 converted by Pacific Airmotive (Pac-Aero).
T-28 Nomad Mark I - Wright R-1820-56S engine (1,300 hp).
T-28 Nomad Mark II - Wright R-1820-76A (1,425 hp)
T-28 Nomad Mark III - Wright R-1820-80 (1,535 hp)

Fairchild AT-28D
Attack model of the T-28D used for Close Air Support (CAS) missions by the USAF and allied Air Forces in Southeast Asia, which were nicknamed "Tangos" by their pilots. It was fitted with six underwing hardpoints and the rocket-powered Stanley Yankee ejection seat; 72 converted by Fairchild Hiller.

YAT-28E
Experimental development of the counter-insurgency T-28D. It was powered by a 2,445 hp (1,823 kW) Lycoming YT-55L-9 turboprop, and armed with two .50 in machine guns and up to 6,000 lb (2,730 kg) of weapons on 12 underwing hardpoints. Three prototypes were converted from T-28As by North American, with the first model flying on 15 February 1963. The project was canceled in 1965.

T-28S Fennec
Ex-USAF T-28As converted in 1959 for use by the French Armée de l'Air, replacing the Morane-Saulnier MS.733A. It was flown by their Escadrilles d'Aviation Légère d'Appui (EALA; "Light Aviation Support Squadrons") in the counterinsurgency role in North Africa from 1959 to 1962. Fitted with an electrically powered sliding canopy, side-armor, a 1,200 hp Wright R-1820-97 supercharged radial engine (the model used in the B-17 bomber), and four underwing hardpoints. It is referred to as the "S" variant because its engine had a supercharger on it; it has also been referred to as the T-28F variant – with the "F" standing for France.

For fire support missions it usually carried two double-mount .50-caliber machine gun pods (with 100 rounds per gun) and two MATRA Type 122 6 x 68mm rocket pods. It could also carry on paired hardpoints a 120 kg.[264 lb.] HE or GP "iron" bomb, a MATRA Type 361 36 x 37mm [1.45-inch] rocket pod, a SNEB 7 x 55mm [2.16-inch] rocket pod, or a MATRA Type 13 single-rail, MATRA Type 20 or Type 21 double-rail, MATRA Type 41 quadruple-rail (2 x 2), or MATRA Type 61 or Type 63 sextuple-rail (3 x 3) SERAM T10 heavy rocket launchers. Improvised napalm bombs (called bidons spéciaux, or "special cans") were created by dropping gas tanks loaded with octagel-thickened fuel inside, then later igniting or detonating the spilled fuel with white phosphorus rockets.
Total 148 airframes bought from Pacific Airmotive (Pac Aero) and modified by Sud-Aviation in France. After the war the French government offered them for sale from 1964 to 1967. They sold most of them to Morocco and Argentina.  Argentina later sold some to Uruguay and Honduras.

T-28P
T-28S Fennec aircraft sold to the Argentinian Navy as carrier-borne attack aircraft. They were given shortened propeller blades and a tailhook to allow carrier landings.

T-28R Nomair
An attempt by Hamilton Aircraft Company of Tucson, Arizona to make a civilianized Nomad III-equivalent out of refurbished ex-USAF T-28As. It had a Wright Cyclone R-1820-80 engine to make it fast and powerful, but had to lengthen the wingspan by seven feet to reduce the stall speed to below a "street-legal" 70 knots. The prototype flew for the first time in September, 1960, and the FAA Type Certificate was received on 15 February 1962. At the time, the T-28-R2 was the fastest single-engined standard category aircraft available in the United States. It had been flown to a height of 38,700 ft. [11,800 m].

T-28R-1 Nomair I
A military trainer that had a tandem cockpit, dual instrumentation and flying controls, and hydraulically-actuated rearward-sliding canopy. Six were sold in 1962 as carrier-landing trainers to the Brazilian Navy and were modified with a carrier arrestor hook. They were later transferred to the Brazilian Air Force.

T-28R-2 Nomair II
Modified to have a cramped five-seater cabin (one pilot and two rows of two passengers) that opened from the port side. Ten aircraft were modified in all; one was sold to a high-altitude photographic company.

RT-28
Photo reconnaissance conversion for counter-insurgency use with Royal Lao Air Force. Number of conversions unknown.

AIDC T-CH-1
A derivative of the T-28 developed by AIDC in Taiwan, the AIDC T-CH-1 was powered by a 1,082 kW (1,451 hp) Avco Lycoming T53-L-701 turboprop engine. Fifty aircraft were produced for the  Taiwanese Air Force between March 1976 and 1981. The type has since been retired.

Operators

Argentine Air Force - 34 T-28A
Argentine Naval Aviation. 65 ex-French Air Force T-28S Fennec aircraft. Last nine transferred to Uruguayan naval aviation in 1980.

Bolivian Air Force at least six T-28Ds.

Brazilian Navy - 18 T-28C
 Democratic Republic of the Congo
Air Force of the Democratic Republic of the Congo - 14 T-28C, 3 T-28B, 10 T-28D

Cuban Air Force - 10 T-28As were ordered by the Batista regime but were never delivered owing to an arms embargo, although at least one T-28 seems to have been acquired at some stage which was put on display at a museum at Playa Girón

Dominican Air Force

Ecuadorian Air Force - nine T-28A

Ethiopian Air Force - 12 T-28A and 12 T-28D

French Air Force - 148 T-28A airframes modified in France (1959) to make the T-28S Fennec COIN model.

Haitian Air Force - 12 ex-French Air Force

Honduran Air Force - eight former Moroccan Air Force Fennecs. One delivered, seven others impounded at Fort Lauderdale

Japanese Air Self-Defense Force - one T-28B

Khmer Air Force operated 47 T-28s in total in service.

Royal Lao Air Force - 55 T-28D

Mexican Air Force - 32 T-28A

Royal Moroccan Air Force - 25 Fennec aircraft 

Nicaraguan Air Force - six T-28D

Philippine Air Force - 12 T-28A

Republic of Korea Air Force

Royal Saudi Air Force

Republic of Vietnam Air Force

Tunisian Air Force - Fennec

ROC Air Force

Royal Thai Air Force - 88 T-28Ds delivered. Retired 1984.

United States Army
United States Air Force - 1194 T-28A, of which 360 converted to "D"
United States Navy - 489 T-28B and 299 T-28C

Uruguayan Naval Aviation - Fennec 

Vietnam People's Air Force

Zaire Air Force

Surviving aircraft

Many T-28s are on display throughout the world. In addition, a considerable number of flyable examples exist in private ownership, as the aircraft is a popular sport plane and warbird.

Argentina
On display
T-28A
 S/N 174112 (ex USAF 51-3574), formerly operated by the Argentine Air Force as E-608. Preserved at the Museo Regional Inter Fuerzas, Estancia Santa Romana, San Luis.
 C/N° 174333 (ex-USAF 51-3795), formerly operated by the Argentine Naval Aviation. Preserved at the Argentine Naval Aviation Museum.

Australia
On display
T-28A
49-1583 - Australian Aviation Museum, Bankstown Airport, New South Wales, Australia.

T-28 TROJAN 50-221 "LITTL JUGGS". Toowoomba Australia

https://www.gluseum.com/AU/Toowoomba/287406544649061/T-28-Trojan-50-221-%22Littl-Juggs%22

Taiwan
On display
T-28A
51-3664 - Chung Cheng Aviation Museum, Taipai Airport, Taiwan.

Thailand

On display
T-28A
49-1538 - Prachuap Khiri Khan AFB in Bangkok, Thailand.
49-1601 - Don Muang Royal Thai Air Force Base, Bangkok, Thailand.
49-1687 - Loei Airport, Loei Province, Thailand.
51-3480 - Udorn Royal Thai Air Force Base, Thailand.
51-3578 - Chiang Mai AFB, Thailand.
51-3740 - Don Muang Royal Thai Air Force Base, Bangkok, Thailand.
153652 - National Memorial, Bangkok, Thailand.
T-28B
137661 - Royal Thai Air Force Museum, Bangkok, Thailand.
138157 - Royal Thai Air Force Museum, Bangkok, Thailand.
138284 - Royal Thai Air Force Museum, Bangkok, Thailand.
138302 - Lopburi AFB, Thailand.

United Kingdom
On display
T-28C
146289 - Norfolk & Suffolk Aviation Museum, Flixton, The Saints, United Kingdom.

United States
On display
T-28A
49-1494 - National Museum of the United States Air Force at Wright-Patterson AFB in Dayton, Ohio. The aircraft is painted as a typical Air Training Command T-28A of the mid-1950s. It was transferred to the museum in September 1965. It is on display in the museum's Cold War Gallery.
49-1663 - Hurlburt Field, Florida.
49-1679 - Reese AFB, Texas.
49-1682 - Laughlin AFB, Texas.
49-1689 - Vance AFB, Oklahoma.
49-1695 - Randolph AFB, Texas.
50-0300 - Dakota Territory Air Museum, Minot, North Dakota.
51-3612 - Museum of Aviation, Robins Air Force Base, Warner Robins, Georgia.
51-7500 - Olympic Flight Museum, Olympia, Washington.
T-28B

137702 - Air Force Flight Test Center Museum, Edwards AFB, California.
137749 - Hill Aerospace Museum, Hill Air Force Base, Utah
137796 - Naval Air Station Anacostia, Washington, DC.
138144 - Naval Air Station Whiting Field, Florida.
138164 - Actively flying and performing in airshows with the Trojan Phlyers in Dallas, TX.
138192 - Aviation Heritage Center of Wisconsin, Sheboygan Memorial Airport, Sheboygan, WI
138247 - War Eagles Air Museum in Santa Teresa, New Mexico.
138263 - Actively flying and based at KRLD Richland Airport, Richland, WA
138311 - Air Heritage Museum in Beaver Falls, Pennsylvania
138326 - National Naval Aviation Museum, Naval Air Station Pensacola, Florida
138339 - Owned by Skydoc 1989–present (2019) Springfield, Illinois performing with the Trojan Horsemen 2003-2017, and Trojan Thunder 2017–present.
138353 - on a pole at Milton, Florida.
140047 - Actively flying and performing in airshows with the Trojan Phlyers in Dallas, TX.
140048 - National Museum of the United States Air Force at Wright-Patterson AFB in Dayton, Ohio.
T-28C
138245 - WarBird Museum of Virginia in Chesterfield, Virginia.
140451 - Middleton Field in Evergreen, Alabama
140454 - Battleship Cove in Fall River, Massachusetts.
140481 - Pima Air & Space Museum adjacent to Davis-Monthan AFB in Tucson, Arizona.
140557 - Naval Air Station Wildwood Aviation Museum, Cape May Airport, Rio Grande, New Jersey.
140659 - Southern Museum of Flight, Birmingham, Alabama.
YAT-28E
0-13786 - Private collection, Port Hueneme, California. One of two surviving air-frames, currently in storage awaiting restoration.

Specifications (T-28D)

See also
Lee Lue

References

Notes

Bibliography

 Andrade, John. Militair 1982. London: Aviation Press Limited, 1982. .
 Avery, Norm. North American Aircraft: 1934–1998, Volume 1. Santa Ana, California: Narkiewicz-Thompson, 1998. .
 Compton, Frank. "November 79 Zulu: the Story of the North American Nomad". Sport Aviation, June 1983.
 
 
 Donald, David and Lake, Jon. Encyclopedia of World Military Aircraft. London:Aerospace Publishing, 1996. .
 Fitzsimons, Bernie. The Defenders: A Comprehensive Guide to Warplanes of the USA. London: Aerospace Publishing, 1988. .
 
 Green, William. Observers Aircraft, 1956. London: Frederick Warne Publishing, 1956.
 
 
 
 
 Hobson, Chris. Vietnam Air Losses, USAF/Navy/Marine, Fixed Wing Aircraft Losses in Southeast 1961–1973. North Branch, Minnesota: Specialty Press, 2001. .
 The Illustrated Encyclopedia of Aircraft (Part Work 1982–1985). London: Orbis Publishing, 1985.
 Krivinyi, Nikolaus. World Military Aviation. New York: Arco Publishing Company, 1977. .
 Pocock, Chris. "Thailand Hones its Air Forces". Air International, Vol. 31, No. 3, September 1986. pp. 113–121, 168. .
 Tate, Jess. "Ultimate Trojan: North American's YAT-28E Project". Air Enthusiast, No. 99, May/June 1999. pp. 58–59. ISSN 0143-5450.
 Taylor, John J.H. and Kenneth Munson.Jane's Pocket Book of Major Combat Aircraft. New York: Collier Books, 1973. .
 Thompson, Kevin. North American Aircraft: 1934–1998 Volume 2. Santa Ana, California: Narkiewicz-Thompson, 1999. .
 Toperczer, Istvan. MiG-17 and MiG-19 Units of the Vietnam War. London: Osprey Publishing Limited, 2001. .
 United States Air Force Museum Guidebook. Wright-Patterson AFB, Ohio: Air Force Museum Foundation, 1975.

Further reading 
 Adcock, Al. T-28 Trojan in Action.  Squadron/Signal Publications Inc. 1989. 
 Cupido, Joe., "Veteran United: A T-28D Trojan Meets Up with a Former Pilot." Air Enthusiast, No. 83, September/October 1999, pp. 16–20 
 Genat, Robert. "Final Tour of Duty - North American's T-28 Trojans". North Branch, Minnesota: Specialty Press, 1996.

External links 

 North American T-28B Trojan – National Museum of the United States Air Force
 Warbird Alley: T-28 page
 T-28 FENNEC : History + 2006 inventory
 T-28 Trojan Registry: The histories of those aircraft that survived military service
 North American T-28 Trojan (Variants/Other Names: AT-28; Fennec)

T-28
1940s United States military trainer aircraft
Single-engined tractor aircraft
Low-wing aircraft
Carrier-based aircraft
Aircraft first flown in 1949